New history may refer to:

 A disciplinary approach that attempts to use history to understand contemporary problems, co-founded by James Harvey Robinson in the early 20th century
 Nouvelle histoire, a French movement in learning that de-emphasized rote learning
 New Mormon history, a style of reporting the history of Mormonism
 Doubting Antiquity School, a historiographical approach to Chinese historical sources begun in the 1910s and 1920s
 Institut Nova Història (New History Institute), a Catalan cultural foundation
 "New History" (Grey's Anatomy), an episode of the TV series Grey's Anatomy

See also
 New Historians
 New historicism